The château de Pupetières is a 19th-century castle which stands in the commune of Chabons, in the Isère department and the Auvergne-Rhône-Alpes region, in France. 

The  has owned the estate since the 13th century, when the primitive castle, then a simple fortified house, was built. Between 1861 and 1866, Alphonse de Virieu, son of Aymon, decided to entrust the reconstruction of Pupetières to two architects: Denis Darcy, for the outbuildings, and Eugène Viollet-le-Duc, for the castle in a neo-gothic style. 

The estate of Pupetières is also linked to the stay of the poet Alphonse de Lamartine, who wrote one of his most famous works of romantic inspiration entitled , which in turn inspired Countess Anna de Noailles.

The castle and its outbuildings were classified as a historical monument by a decree of 8 November 1972. The private property, park and building are open to visitors, but the opening hours and entrance fees are set by the owner.

Location 
Pupetières Castle is located in the northern part of the French department of Isère, on the territory of the commune of Chabons, in the Canton of Le Grand-Lemps. 

History

From the Middle Ages to the Revolution 
In 1222, a branch of the Virieu family built the first castle, which was the centre of the seigneury of Châbons. Originally it was only a fortified house where the Virieu family lived until the French Revolution. During the revolutionary period, the castle was completely devastated and burned down.

At that time the family property was confiscated, and the Virieus had to move near Geneva, Switzerland, where another branch of their family was established.

Contemporary era 
On her return in 1805, the Countess de Virieu found only three ruined towers of her old fortified house, which had been looted and burned during the Revolution.

She decided to buy back her land from the Grand-Lemps, Montrevel and Pupetières, and it was her grandson Alphonse who entrusted the reconstruction of the castle to Eugène Viollet-le-Duc a few years later (around 1861). He would be assisted by the architect Denis Darcy.

According to an article published in Le Dauphiné libéré, more than 45 different tile models were needed to create the roof. At the end of work, a new castle had been built in the heart of the estate, in accordance with the idea that its author had of his work of "restoration":

In its columns devoted to world news, the newspaper Le Matin (10 July 1899) wrote that indicating a certain notability of this family and its castle.

Description 

The following is an excerpt from a text written by Stéphanie de Virieu, a French painter and sculptor and daughter of François-Henri de Virieu, describing the castle and its estate in 1859 (the year before its restoration): 

In the Mercure de France, the reader can discover another description of the castle, signed by Paul Berret and published on 1 August 1933:

The elements protected as historical monuments are the facades and roofs of the castle and the outbuildings, and the following rooms with their decoration: vestibule, staircase with its wrought-iron banister, dining room, large lounge with its fireplace, library including book cupboards on two floors, the ceremonial room known as the Duchess of Noailles' bedroom with its fireplace and the bedroom of Queen Esther.

Exterior appearance 

The castle is a fine example of 19th century neo-gothic architecture in the department of Isère. With a surface area of 7500 m2, different building materials were used for its reconstruction in 1861. Thus the stone walls, alongside those of brick, and pebbles in pesci. A projecting, hexagonal-shaped forebody, adorned with a balustrade, marks the entrance. 

The seven towers, topped in turrets, and the main building are covered with glazed scaly tiles that highlight the multiple offsets of the roofs of the castle.

The outbuildings (former stables and servants' quarters), also renovated, are located near the monumental entrance where visitors are also welcomed.

Interior appearance 

Inside the building, the decorations also mix different materials. The painted woods of the large living room, where a monumental fireplace is enthroned, whose mantle sculpture represents a scene recalling that the Virieu family offered land so that the Chartreux could build their abbey of the Sylve Bénite (Le Pin). 
This same room has several tapestries from the Beauvais Royal Manufactory. The library is also adorned with painted woods and houses many precious books and archives that the family had hidden before taking refuge in Switzerland. These writings could thus return to the bookcases on two floors of the property. Brick and marble are also very much present inside the castle, as are numerous draped forgeries characteristic of Viollet-le-Duc's restorations.

Gardens 
The castle is surrounded by a soberly laid out landscaped estate with a waterfall, a large flowery landscaped park with its pond, situated to the south of the building. This sector of the property dominates the valley of the Bourbre (called the "Petit Grésivaudan" by the local historian Félix Crozet), in the distance the silhouette of the Notre Dame de l'Assomption de Châbons church standing out on the horizon during sunset.

Events

Festival Berlioz 

The programme (called "The spiritual concert" under the direction of Hervé Niquet) presented several musical works:

Marc-Antoine Charpentier
Te Deum, Marches pour les trompettes » (extracts) 
Georg Frideric Handel
Water Music (Suites I et II) 
Concerti grossi n°4 et n°5 op. 3 (extracts) 
Water Music (Suite III) 
Music for the Royal Fireworks (accompanied by fireworks).

Plant Day 
Every year, the owners of the Château de Pupetières organise the "Plant Day", which welcomes a large public who come to discover a park with numerous exhibitors of various flowers and plants, as well as animations, conferences, workshops and exhibitions. Visits to the Château are also offered in conjunction with this event.

The 8th Plant Day took place during September 2019 with the presence of 70 exhibitors. During the 2017 event, two documentary films were screened on the occasion of the 6th anniversary.

Gallery

Notes

References

External links 

 

Pupetière